Hans Wiegel (born 16 July 1941) is a retired Dutch politician of the People's Party for Freedom and Democracy (VVD) and businessperson.

Wiegel studied Law at the University of Amsterdam before switching to Political science obtaining a Bachelor of Social Science degree and worked as a freelance political pundit from July 1965 until April 1967. Wiegel also served as Chairman of the political youth organisation JOVD from November 1965 until October 1966. Wiegel became a Member of the House of Representatives shortly after election of 1967 taking office on 18 April 1967 serving as a frontbencher and spokesperson for Local Government Affairs. After the election of 1971 Party Leader and Parliamentary leader Molly Geertsema was appointed as Deputy Prime Minister and Minister of the Interior in the Cabinet Biesheuvel I announced he was stepping down and Wiegel was anonymously selected as his successor taking office on 1 July 1971. For the elections of 1972 and 1977 Wiegel served as Lijsttrekker (top candidate) and following a successful cabinet formation with Christian-democratic Leader Dries van Agt formed the Cabinet Van Agt–Wiegel with Wiegel appointed as Deputy Prime Minister and Minister of the Interior taking office on 19 December 1977. 

For the election of 1981 Wiegel again served as Lijsttrekker but the following cabinet formation resulted in a coalition between the Christian-democrats and Labour Party and he returned to the House of Representatives as Parliamentary leader on 25 August 1981. In April 1982 Wiegel unexpectedly announced he was stepping down as Leader following his nomination as the next Queen's Commissioner of Friesland and endorsed rising star Ed Nijpels as his successor and was installed Queen's Commissioner serving from 16 June 1982 until 1 February 1994. Wiegel also became active in the private and public sectors as a corporate and non-profit director and served on several state commissions and councils on behalf of the government, and worked as a trade association executive serving as Chairman of the Brewers association from August 1984 until November 2012, the Healthcare Insurance association from February 1994 until February 2012 and the Travel Companies association from May 1994 until June 1995 and as Vice Chairman of the Industry and Employers confederation (VNO-NCW) from May 2008 until February 2012. Wiegel continued to be active in politics and was elected as a Member of the Senate after the Senate election of 1995 taking office on 13 June 1995  serving as a frontbencher and chairing the parliamentary committees for General Affairs and the Interior and as spokesperson for the Interior, Governmental Reforms and the Royal Family. In March 2000 Wiegel unexpectedly announced his retirement and resigned from the Senate on 1 April 2000.

Wiegel semi-retired from active politics at 58 but continued to be active in the private and public sectors as a corporate and non-profit director and lobbyist, and worked as a occasional mediator for coalition agreements and political crisis's and as a political pundit and columnist for De Telegraaf, Algemeen Dagblad and WNL. Wiegel was known for his abilities as a skillful debater and effective negotiator and continued to comment on political affairs as a statesman until he suffered a minor stroke in August 2019 which forced him to undergo rehabilitation.

Early life

Hans Wiegel was born on 16 July 1941 in Amsterdam in the Province of North Holland in a secular family as the only son of Wilhelm Wiegel III (born 21 March 1913 in Amsterdam) and Sophia Maria Alberdina Smolenaars (born 3 November 1915 in Cimahi in the Dutch East Indies). After completing gymnasium in Hilversum in 1959, Wiegel started studying law at the University of Amsterdam. After a couple of months he switched his major to political science and earned a Candidate degree in 1965. He decided not to pursue a master's degree. Instead, he became involved in politics. Wiegel has been active within the youth wing of the People's Party for Freedom and Democracy, the Youth Organisation Freedom and Democracy, of which he had been a member since 1961. In 1963 he was appointed to its national board and served as Chairman from 1965 until 1966.

Politics
In 1967 Wiegel was elected as a Member of the House of Representatives. In 1971, when he was only thirty years old, he became the Leader of his party. During the period of the Cabinet Den Uyl Wiegel acted as the main Leader of the Opposition against the Cabinet and Prime Minister Joop den Uyl. In 1977 he negotiated the formation of the Cabinet Van Agt-Wiegel, in this cabinet he became Minister of the Interior and Deputy Prime Minister, Wiegel prepared the constitutional revision of 1983.

In 1995 he was elected as a Member of the Senate. In 1999 Wiegel caused a short cabinet crisis by voting against the constitutional revision that would make national referendums possible. This crisis is called the Night of Wiegel. Wiegel left the Senate in 2000, soon after the Night of Wiegel.
Wiegel led the People's Party for Freedom and Democracy in Dutch general election of 1972, Dutch general election of 1977, and Dutch General Election of 1981. During his leadership the People's Party for Freedom and Democracy orientation shifted away from the upper class and towards the middle class and educated workers; this led to electoral success.

In 1982 Wiegel left national politics. He was awarded honorary membership of the People's Party for Freedom and Democracy and became Queen's Commissioner of Friesland from 16 June 1982 until 1 February 1994. During his period as Queen's Commissioner Wiegel became known as the "Oracle of Diever", because he played an important role advising the VVD and commenting on events in national politics. In 1986 Wiegel was asked to return to the Ministry of the Interior and Kingdom Relations; he refused, however.

Possible return to politics
On the evening of 6 May 2002 in Leeuwarden, he would be meeting with Pim Fortuyn, who saw a suitable Prime Minister in Wiegel. Earlier that day however, Fortuyn was assassinated in Hilversum.

In October 2005 the local branch of the People's Party for Freedom and Democracy in Alphen aan den Rijn called all other local branches to sign a petition to get Wiegel back in active politics. More than 90% of the branches supported this petition. 
Wiegel wanted to announce whether he is making a comeback or not in March/April 2006. However then leader Jozias van Aartsen stated in January 2006 that Wiegel most likely will be the People's Party for Freedom and Democracy's candidate for Prime Minister in the 2007 elections. In the last years the Dutch press has speculated – he rarely responds to rumors – whether Wiegel will make a comeback.

On 8 March 2006, the day after a poor showing of the People's Party for Freedom and Democracy in the Dutch municipal elections of 2006, Wiegel issued a press statement to the effect that he will not return to Dutch politics again.

On 22 November 2007 Wiegel was announced that he should go to the People's Party for Freedom and Democracy in a broad liberal movement together with the Party for Freedom of Geert Wilders, Rita Verdonk's Proud of the Netherlands and the Democrats 66. Besides Rita Verdonk none of these parties favor of this plan. On 15 September 2009 he repeated these words in the morning bulletin Goodmorning Netherlands Wiegel then called his party should seek cooperation with the Party for Freedom.

Thirty years after leaving national politics, Wiegel is still mentioned often as a potential Prime Minister. He still is very popular among People's Party for Freedom and Democracy party members in the Netherlands. He has 'threatened' to return to national politics a number of times, usually resulting in the People's Party for Freedom and Democracy going up in the polls. His opponents admonish this behaviour, implying that he is just trying to keep himself from being forgotten.

On 12 April 2010 during a broadcast of the Dutch TV program De Wereld Draait Door Wiegel humoristic joked to be the best Prime Minister the Netherlands never had. That view was shared by politician Joost Eerdmans on Wiegel's seventieth birthday. On 29 May 2012 in an interview with the Algemeen Dagblad he expressed criticism on the agreement the People's Party for Freedom and Democracy and the Christian Democratic Appeal made with the Democrats 66, GreenLeft and ChristianUnion on the budgetary crisis and called it "a serious strategic error".

Personal
Wiegel married his first wife Jacqueline Francina "Pien" Frederiks (born 9 September 1954) on 1 June 1973. He had two children with her, Erik (born 1975) and Marieke (born 1977). On 6 November 1980 tragedy struck when Pien Frederiks died of complications from suffering a car crash, she was twenty-six years old. She left her two young children behind Erik (five) and Marieke (three). On 7 April 1982 Wiegel quietly remarried to his late wife's older sister Marianne Frederiks (born 21 September 1951). On 6 January 2005 tragedy struck again for the now sixty-three-year-old Wiegel when, in a sad twist of fate, Marianne Frederiks died in a car crash at the age of fifty-three. From 2006 until 2010 Wiegel had a relationship with Madelon Spoor. Wiegel currently lives in a farm in Oudega, a small town in the municipality Súdwest-Fryslân in the Province of Friesland, he also owns a Pied-à-terre in The Hague.

On 6 August 2019 Wiegel announced that he had suffered a light stroke at his home and that he would be undergoing rehabilitation in the next few months.

Decorations

References

External links

Official
  H. (Hans) Wiegel Parlement & Politiek
  H. Wiegel (VVD) Eerste Kamer der Staten-Generaal

 

|-
 

 

 

 

 
 

 

 
 

 

 

 

 
 

 

 

 

 
 

 

 

1941 births
Living people
Businesspeople from Amsterdam
Chairmen of Trade associations of the Netherlands
Deputy Prime Ministers of the Netherlands
Dutch columnists
Dutch chief executives in the finance industry
Dutch chief executives in the food industry
Dutch chief executives in the healthcare industry
Dutch corporate directors
Dutch investors
Dutch lobbyists
Dutch nonprofit directors
Dutch nonprofit executives
Dutch political commentators
Dutch political writers
Dutch school administrators
Dutch speechwriters
Dutch stock traders
Dutch trade association executives
Grand Crosses of the Order of the Crown (Belgium)
Grand Cross of the Order of Civil Merit
Grand Officers of the Order of Orange-Nassau
King's and Queen's Commissioners of Friesland
Knights of the Order of the Netherlands Lion
Leaders of the People's Party for Freedom and Democracy
Members of the House of Representatives (Netherlands)
Members of the Senate (Netherlands)
Members of the Social and Economic Council
Ministers of the Interior of the Netherlands
Politicians from Amsterdam
People from Blaricum
People from Súdwest-Fryslân
People's Party for Freedom and Democracy politicians
University of Amsterdam alumni
Writers from Amsterdam
20th-century Dutch businesspeople
20th-century Dutch male writers
20th-century Dutch politicians
21st-century Dutch businesspeople
21st-century Dutch male writers
21st-century Dutch politicians